Starpath was a U.S. company known for creating the Starpath Supercharger in August 1982. The company was founded under the name Arcadia Corporation in 1981 by Alan Bayley, Robert Brown, and Craig Nelson.  It changed its name to Starpath shortly after for trademark reasons because Emerson Radio Corporation had released a video game console named the Emerson Arcadia 2001.

The Starpath Supercharger is a peripheral cartridge for the Atari 2600 video game console that expands the machine capabilities by adding more RAM, allowing for higher resolution graphics and larger games, and by providing a connector to which a regular cassette player can be connected, thus permitting larger games, stored on tape, to be loaded.

Starpath merged with Epyx in 1984. , rights to Starpath games are owned by Bridgestone Multimedia, a religious multimedia company.

References

 
 

Video game companies established in 1981
Defunct video game companies of the United States